Jozef Slovák (born 1951) is a Slovak serial killer who murdered at least five women in Slovakia and the Czech Republic from 1978 to 1991. He is currently serving a life sentence for four murders in Ilava Prison in Slovakia.

Slovák remains one of the most significant participants in the controversial wide-ranging amnesty of the newly elected President of Czechoslovakia Václav Havel. Because of this amnesty, Slovák served only eight years in prison for the murder of a 21-year-old Yugoslavian woman, and after his release, murdered at least four other young women in less than a year and a half before again being captured. Jozef Slovák remains one of only two people convicted of a series of murders without any ties to organized crime in the modern history of Slovakia (the other being Ondrej Rigo).

Early life 
Little is known about Slovák's early life. He was born in Plavecký Štvrtok, Slovakia on April 7, 1951. Altogether, he was sentenced to prison eight times during his life.

Murders 
Jozef Slovák was convicted of the murder of five women, listed below.

Jozef Slovák met his first victim, Yugoslavian woman Blažica P. on a train. On August 22, 1978, he took her into the woods in Bratislava, Železná studnička (today part of Bratislava Forest Park) and tried to have sex with her. As she refused and tried to fight back, he choked her to death. After the murder, he dragged her body deeper into the forest and covered it with branches. After burning some of Blažica P.'s clothing right there in the forest, he gave some of the things she had on her body to his girlfriend.

In 1982, Slovák was sentenced to 15 years in prison for this first murder. He started to serve his sentence in Leopoldov Prison but was released on probation March 10, 1990 because of a wide-ranging amnesty by president of Czechoslovakia Václav Havel. Almost two-thirds of Czechoslovak criminals at that time were released from prison practically at the same time. Many murderers, career criminals and other dangerous people were released from prisons on probation or parole. Without the amnesty, Slovák would not have been released until 1997. From 1990 to 1991, Slovák murdered at least four women, committing his second murder just four months after being released from prison.

He met his second victim, Monika Ondíková (from Moldava nad Bodvou, Slovakia), in Prague. On July 4, 1990, he left the capital with her for Konopiště, near Benešov, about 50 km (30 mi) southeast of Prague. In the manor park, Jozef Slovák shot her eight times from his gas gun, using neuroparalytic gas. Then, he hit her in the head several times with a stick, killing her. He searched the body, finding and stealing US$2,400, 800 German marks, over 16,000 Austrian schillings, a ring and her makeup. Again, he dragged the body deeper into the nearby forest and covered it with branches. Slovák returned to her body a week later to put a railway ticket to České Budějovice into her pocket, trying to confuse the police.

Two days after his last murder, Slovák was arrested in Bratislava. Bruises were found on his body caused by Anna Královičová. The police also found an illegal firearm.

On August 20, 1993, he was sentenced to life imprisonment by the City Court of Bratislava for the murders of Monika Ondíková, Vladislava Maříková, Diana Lopuchovská and Anna Královičová.

In 1997, Slovák complained to Ilava city representatives that he was unable to create any new inventions in his field of electronics, mainly because of the lack of tools not having access to a typewriter.

Personality and psychopathological profile 
Jozef Slovák is of above average intelligence, and is the author and holder of several patents in electronics. Psychologists arranged by the court found him to be a narcissistic psychopath.

See also
 List of people sentenced to life imprisonment in Slovakia
 List of serial killers by country

References

Sources 
 Kriminalistika.eu - "Kriminalistika: Muzeum zločinu" (in Czech) 
 Interview with Jozef Slovák in Šarm magazine (in Slovak) from 2008

1951 births
Czechoslovak murderers of children
Czechoslovak serial killers
Living people
Male serial killers
Slovak prisoners and detainees
Slovak prisoners sentenced to life imprisonment
People convicted of murder by Slovakia
People with antisocial personality disorder
People with narcissistic personality disorder
Prisoners sentenced to life imprisonment by Slovakia
Slovak people convicted of murder
Slovak serial killers
Violence against women in Europe
Violence against women in Slovakia
Violence against women in the Czech Republic
Violence against women in Czechoslovakia